WUPA (channel 69) is a television station in Atlanta, Georgia, United States, affiliated with The CW. The station is owned by the CBS News and Stations group and maintains studios on Northeast Expressway (I-85) in unincorporated DeKalb County (with an Atlanta mailing address); its transmitter is located near Shepherds Lane and Arnold Avenue in the Woodland Hills section of northeastern Atlanta (near North Druid Hills).

Channel 69 in Atlanta first began broadcasting in 1981 as WVEU. Years of technical issues provoked by interference to mobile radio users and consequent limitations on the station's operating hours and signal strength contributed to the failure of subscription television (STV) and a music video service that operated the station. WVEU's local founders sold the station to CBS in 1994 at a time when CBS needed to find a new affiliate in Atlanta, but the network was able to negotiate to affiliate with another, more built-up station instead. WVEU became an affiliate of UPN and was then sold to the Paramount Stations Group, which substantially improved the station's programming and ratings in the years that followed before UPN was replaced with The CW in 2006. In addition to a hybrid local/national 10 p.m. newscast, WUPA is the preseason television home of Atlanta Falcons football.

History

Construction, land mobile dispute, and STV years (1981–1984)

In 1978, the Federal Communications Commission (FCC) received two applications for new television stations to use channel 69 in Atlanta; on August 19, 1980, the final decision was given to award it to a consortium of Atlanta-based investors known as Broadcast Corporation of Georgia (BCG), which proposed a hybrid operation consisting of daytime ad-supported programming and a subscription television (STV) service in evening hours. The antenna atop the Peachtree Plaza Hotel from which channel 69 would radiate had been hoisted into place in mid-August, days before the license decision was publicized. The subscription programming would be supplied under the Superstar TV name by Subscription Television of Greater Atlanta, a consortium originally reported to be co-owned by Clint Murchison—who had subscription television holdings in other cities, including the Super TV service in the Washington, D.C., and Baltimore markets—and Atlanta electronics manufacturer Dynacom, which would produce the decoders subscribers would need to view Superstar programming. In actuality, the owner was not Clint Murchison but Clyde A. Murchison, whom a 1982 article in The Atlanta Constitution described as Clint's great-nephew.

WVEU began broadcasting on August 22, 1981. However, a planned full launch on October 1 had to be scuttled because of interference the station's broadcasts on channel 69—at the top of the TV band, 800 to 806 MHz—were generating to two-way land mobile radio transmissions. Further, the station had planned to fill daytime hours with programming from a business news service known as The Market Report, which ran into financial difficulties and was unable to start on time. Superstar TV was able to begin operating before the end of the year, with an official kickoff held on January 8, 1982, but WVEU was still required to shut down until 7 p.m. on weekday evenings, essentially leaving it without any commercial, non-STV programming.

The two-way radio dispute continued to loom large over every facet of WVEU's operations for several years, as the station subsisted on production contracts. In June 1983, the FCC ruled that the station could begin operating at 50 percent power before 7 p.m. if it paid an estimated $250,000 to relocate all of the land mobile users affected by interference. However, these users protested the decision and filed for reconsideration with the commission. In February 1984, the FCC ordered the station to engage the users or pay them to relocate on penalty of losing the provisional program test authority under which WVEU had operated since 1981. While the dispute was resolved by July 1984, when the FCC granted a full license to BCG, the issue had doomed Superstar TV, which filed for bankruptcy in April 1983 and made its last broadcasts on the morning of July 23 with fewer than 3,000 subscribers.

The independent years (1984–1995)
To replace Superstar TV, WVEU signed an operating agreement with VideoMusic Channel, which had broadcast music videos on Atlanta-area cable systems, to program nearly all of channel 69's airtime. The station brought the programming in-house in August 1984 before eventually canceling it altogether and replacing it with syndicated shows and reruns because, it learned, music videos were not very "salable" to advertisers. That same year, negotiations were held and an initial agreement reached to sell the station to the RBP Corporation of Massachusetts, but no transaction was consummated.

The station also made its first entry into the television sports market, airing what was to be a package of 30 Atlanta Hawks NBA games in the 1984–85 season, with John Sterling as the play-by-play announcer. This package was whittled down to 19 games because of insufficient advertiser interest. A new 20-game package was carried in the following season, this time with the Hawks selling the advertising time; the Hawks later added a game at The Omni that sold out, their first home telecast in two years.

Through the mid-1990s, WVEU became Atlanta's television station of last resort while a stabilizing WATL (channel 36) and a growing WGNX (channel 46) became the city's primary local independents. In a 1991 article by Prentis Rogers in The Atlanta Constitution, it was described as the city's "quicker picker-upper", constantly airing shows that the local network affiliates passed on. These included CBS's morning news program (under the titles of the CBS Morning News, The Morning Program, and CBS This Morning) from 1986 through 1994 and its late night programming, as well as numerous preempted network sports telecasts that the local affiliates could not air due to scheduling conflicts. Beyond displaced network programs, WVEU featured an eclectic mix, a function of being what Business Atlanta writer Russell Shaw called the "poor cousin" of Atlanta independent television. There were telecasts of martial arts movies under the banner Black Belt Theater and later hosted by Morgus the Magnificent, a character first introduced decades prior in Detroit and New Orleans; professional wrestling; a weekday public access show, Community; The Auto Doctor, a locally produced weekly magazine show about cars; and jazz music video show Jazz Beat. After another proposed sale, this one to the Home Shopping Network in 1989, fell through, the station added Japanese-language programming under the title 600 Station to its morning lineup.

Almost a CBS affiliate

On May 23, 1994, as a result of the network winning the rights to air NFC football games, New World Communications announced an affiliation deal with Fox to switch the affiliations of most of New World's stations to the network. One of the stations involved was WAGA-TV (channel 5), which would replace Fox-owned WATL as that network's Atlanta outlet. This left CBS in the position of seeking a new Atlanta-area affiliate.

In July, BCG approached CBS and proposed to sell it WVEU; two months later, still with no better station signed, CBS agreed to spend $22 million to purchase WVEU for conversion to a CBS owned-and-operated station. A CBS move to WVEU would have meant an unprecedented campaign to build up the station, including major expenses in promotion, starting a local news service, and possibly relocating from the facilities off of I-85, which would be of inadequate size to house a full-service, news-producing station. One consultant interviewed by The Atlanta Journal-Constitution estimated CBS's total expenses as $100 million over several years. For the outgoing Broadcast Corporation of Georgia, owners of a station that had never turned a profit in its 13-year history and became cash flow-positive in 1993 for the first time in its history, and particularly for majority owner David Harris, it was an unexpected windfall.

Despite having agreed to buy WVEU, CBS continued to campaign for a better partner. It continued to negotiate with Fox and with Tribune Broadcasting, then-owner of WGNX, and by mid-November, the paperwork to purchase channel 69 had not been filed at the FCC. On November 16, it was announced that CBS would not be moving to WVEU but instead to WGNX, a station that already produced local newscasts, with CBS committing to buy WVEU and immediately resell it.

UPN affiliation (1995–2006)
Even though channel 69 was not to be the CBS affiliate in Atlanta, WVEU emerged from the sale to CBS having secured a valuable network affiliation. WATL aligned with the upstart WB network for January 1995, and the new United Paramount Network (UPN) still had not signed up an Atlanta affiliate. There was no other practical outlet with which the new UPN could affiliate in Atlanta, and UPN signed an agreement with WVEU in December, a month before its launch. Behind UPN came a buyer: the Paramount Stations Group, which began to negotiate with CBS to acquire WVEU. Paid programming was reduced from 40 hours a week to 13, and stronger syndicated and UPN shows lifted its ratings.

In May 1995, CBS agreed to sell WVEU to Viacom, the parent company of the Paramount Stations Group, for $27 million; to stay under the 12-station ownership limit of the time, the company sold one of its non-UPN stations, KSLA in Shreveport, Louisiana. After closing on the purchase, Viacom began a significant makeover of the station. This included a new call sign, WUPA (for United Paramount/Atlanta), which it assumed on December 11, as well as a more aggressive stance to purchasing syndicated programming. Household ratings tripled, and the network recognized WUPA as its first affiliate of the year.

In the late 1990s, WUPA began to add local sports programming. When TBS converted from a superstation to a basic cable channel, it was forced to reduce the number of Atlanta Braves baseball games it telecast. WUPA picked up an 11-game package of Braves games sold by TBS for the 1998 season, which became a 30-game package for 1999 before being reclaimed for the new Turner South regional cable channel in 2000. When Atlanta got a hockey team, the new Atlanta Thrashers aired 15 games a year on WUPA. The Hawks returned to channel 69 in 2001 after 15 years when their existing carrier, WHOT-TV (channel 34), was sold to be changed to Spanish-language programming.

Over the course of the early 2000s, WUPA sought to bolster its local identity. It changed its branding from "UPN 69" to "UPN Atlanta" in 2003 and began producing non-news specials; it also sponsored the Music Midtown festival.

The CW (2006–present)

On January 24, 2006, the Warner Bros. unit of Time Warner and CBS Corporation (which had been created as a result of the split of Viacom at the start of the year) announced that the two companies would shut down The WB and UPN and combine the networks' respective programming to create a new "fifth" network called The CW; the day of the announcement, it was revealed that 11 of CBS Corporation's 15 UPN affiliates, including WUPA, would become CW stations.

Local programming

Newscasts
On April 5, 2004, NBC affiliate WXIA-TV began producing a half-hour prime time newscast at 10 p.m. for WUPA titled UPN Atlanta News at Ten. This program, for which WXIA-TV sold the advertising, was accompanied by a separately produced, live half-hour talk program at 10:30 p.m. titled Atlanta Tonight. Up against stiff competition from the incumbent 10 p.m. newscast on WAGA, both programs seen on channel 69 suffered, and the 10 p.m. newscast and Atlanta Tonight were canceled on August 28, 2005, for "economic reasons".

On January 17, 2020, CBS Television Stations announced that it would be introducing a nightly 10 p.m. newscast for WUPA, produced by New York City sister station WCBS-TV; the program debuted February 17. In March 2020, following the temporary shutdown of the CBS Broadcast Center during the COVID-19 pandemic in New York City, and for the next five months, WUPA began simulcasting another 10 p.m. newscast produced within the CBS group: that aired by WSBK-TV in Boston, with local coverage limited to a news ticker and prerecorded weather forecasts.

On August 11, 2020, the Atlanta-oriented newscast was relaunched, with production shifted to KTVT in Fort Worth, Texas. On July 18, 2022, this newscast was relaunched as Atlanta Now News under a new hybrid local/national format which continues to be produced from Fort Worth.

In addition to the newscast, WUPA produces a weekly public affairs program known as Focus Atlanta.

Sports
In 2014, WUPA became the official television station of the Atlanta Falcons, gaining rights to its preseason games and introducing weekly programs dedicated to the team. The preseason broadcasts were initially produced by CBS Sports but have been produced by Tupelo Raycom since 2017.

In 2017, as part of a broadcasting deal with the city's new Major League Soccer franchise Atlanta United FC and Fox Sports Networks, WUPA began to air the team's overflow games. WUPA was replaced in this role by WPCH-TV for the 2022 season.

Technical information

Subchannels
The station's digital signal is multiplexed:

Analog-to-digital conversion
The station shut down its analog signal, over UHF channel 69, on June 12, 2009, as part of the federally mandated transition from analog to digital television; its digital broadcasts remained on UHF channel 43.

The station was repacked from channel 43 to 36 in 2019.

Notes

References

External links

MeTVAtlanta.com – MeTV Atlanta official website

UPA
CBS News and Stations
The CW affiliates
Start TV affiliates
TBD (TV network) affiliates
MeTV affiliates
Charge! (TV network) affiliates
Television channels and stations established in 1981
National Hockey League over-the-air television broadcasters
1981 establishments in Georgia (U.S. state)